James Andrew may refer to:

James Andrew (MP) (fl. 1410), MP for Ipswich
 James Osgood Andrew (1794–1871), American Bishop of the Methodist Episcopal Church and the Methodist Episcopal Church, South
 James Andrew (educator) (c. 1774–1833), Principal of the East India Military College at Croydon
 James Andrew (physician) (1829–1897), English physician, Fellow of the Royal College of Physicians

See also

James Andrews (disambiguation)